Body count usually refers to:

Body count, the total number of people killed in a particular event
Body count, a slang term for the number of people that someone has had sexual relations with

Body Count or Bodycount may refer to:

Film
Body Count (1986 film), an Italian slasher film directed by Ruggero Deodato
Body Count (1997 film) or Below Utopia, an American thriller directed by Kurt Voss
Body Count (1998 film), an American crime thriller directed by Robert Patton-Spruill

Music
Body Count (band), a heavy metal band formed by Ice-T in 1990
Body Count (album), a 1992 album by Body Count
"Body Count", the title track of the 1992 album
"Bodycount", a song by Jessie Reyez
"Body Count", a song by Justin Timberlake from his 2013 album The 20/20 Experience
"Body Count", a song by Mozzy from his 2020 album Beyond Bulletproof

Video games
Body Count (video game), a 1994 rail shooter for the Sega Genesis
Bodycount (video game), a 2011 first-person shooter by Codemasters

Other
Body Count (book), a 2012 book by Burl Barer
"Body Count" (CSI: Miami), an episode of CSI: Miami

See also
Casualty estimation, the process of estimating the number of injuries or deaths in a particular event that has already occurred
Casualty prediction, the process of predicting the number of injuries or deaths in a particular event that has not yet occurred
Operation Body Count, a 1994 first-person shooter video game